Ontario Greenbelt may refer to:

 Greenbelt (Golden Horseshoe)
 Greenbelt (Ottawa)